Patricia O'Rawe (died 12 December 2017) was an Irish republican who formerly served as a politician in Northern Ireland.

O'Rawe was first elected to Armagh City and District Council in 2001, representing Sinn Féin.  At the 2003 Northern Ireland Assembly election, she was elected as a representative in Newry and Armagh. However, she failed to be re-selected at convention by local party members prior to the 2007 election. In April 2007, O'Rawe resigned from Armagh District Council and was succeeded by Mary Doyle. She died on 12 December 2017.

References

Armagh District Council, 1993-2005
Second Sinn Féin member deselected
Sinn Féin: Pat O'Rawe MLA Newry Armagh

20th-century births
2017 deaths
Year of birth missing
Place of birth missing
Mayors of places in Northern Ireland
Sinn Féin MLAs
Northern Ireland MLAs 2003–2007
Female members of the Northern Ireland Assembly
Women mayors of places in Northern Ireland
Sinn Féin councillors in Northern Ireland